Montabaur was one of the five Regierungsbezirke of Rhineland-Palatinate, Germany into which the newly founded state was divided until 1968.  The others were:  Rheinhessen (established 1946, seat in Mainz), Pfalz (established 1945, seat in Neustadt an der Weinstraße), Koblenz and Trier (both established by Prussia in 1816.

History 
Regierungsbezirk Wiesbaden, formed in 1866 as part of the  Prussian province of Hesse-Nassau, had been divided by after the Second World War by the occupying powers as it lay astride a zone boundary. The majority of the Regierungsbezirk lay in the American Zone and became part of the state of Hesse in 1945. The Regierungsbezirk of Montabaur had to be created for the smaller northwestern part and became part of the state of Rhineland-Palatinate in 1946.

The Regierungsbezirk of Montabaur was dissolved on 1 October 1968 and incorporated into  Koblenz. The area of Regierungsbezirk Montabaur largely corresponds to the modern counties of  Rhein-Lahn-Kreis and Westerwaldkreis.

Former administrative divisions 
The Regierungsbezirk of Montabaur was divided into the counties of Oberwesterwaldkreis (Westerburg), Loreleykreis (Sankt Goarshausen), Unterlahnkreis (Diez) and Unterwesterwaldkreis (Montabaur).

Presidents 
 1946–1947: Peter Altmeier (1899–1977)
 1947–1951: Alois Zimmer (1896–1973)
 1952–1962: Hermann Schüling (1897–1977)
 1962–1963: Clemens Josef Maria Schlüter (1911–1963)
 1963–1967: Walter Schmitt (1914–1994) (personal union with Koblenz)
 1967–1968: Waldemar Leibmann (1923–2004) (personal union with Koblenz)

References 

Former states and territories of Rhineland-Palatinate
History of the Westerwald
Rhein-Lahn-Kreis
Westerwaldkreis
States and territories disestablished in 1968
States and territories established in 1946
Former government regions of Germany